Tang Xiao’ou (born 1968) is a Chinese billionaire, computer scientist and the founder of SenseTime, an artificial intelligence (AI) company. He is also a Professor of Information Engineering at the Chinese University of Hong Kong.

Biography 
Tang studied at the University of Science and Technology of China and graduated with a B.S. degree in computer science in 1990. He travelled to America and acquired an M.S. degree from the University of Rochester in 1991, and a doctorate in computer vision from the Massachusetts Institute of Technology in 1996.

After graduation, he worked at Microsoft Research Asia from 2005 to 2008. Tang co-founded SenseTime with Xu Li in 2014. Upon SenseTime's IPO in December 2021, Tang was estimated to have a net worth of approximately $3.4 billion. He currently serves as Associate Dean of the Chinese University of Hong Kong.

Honors and awards
Tang is an IEEE fellow and a general chair of the ICCV in 2009. He is a former editor of the International Journal of Computer Vision (IJCV). Tang received Best Paper Award at the Conference on Computer Vision and Pattern Recognition (CVPR) in 2009. He spearheaded the first facial recognition to beat human accuracy.

References

External links
Homepage at the Chinese University of Hong Kong
 SenseTime

Living people
1968 births
Artificial intelligence researchers
Machine learning researchers
Massachusetts Institute of Technology alumni
University of Rochester alumni
Fellow Members of the IEEE
University of Science and Technology of China alumni
Microsoft Research people
Academic staff of the Chinese University of Hong Kong
Chinese computer scientists
Chinese technology company founders